Sai Jayalakshmy Jayaram (born 16 February 1977 in Chennai) is a former professional female tennis player.

In her career, she won seven singles and 34 doubles titles on the ITF Women's Circuit. On 25 December 2000, she reached her best singles ranking of world No. 331. On 18 June 2001, she peaked at No. 249 in the WTA doubles rankings.

Playing for India Fed Cup team, Jayalakshmy Jayaram has a win–loss record of 6–7.

She had a notable victory over Nina Bratchikova in 2005.

She made her WTA Tour main-draw debut at the 2003 Hyderabad Open, in the doubles event partnering Rushmi Chakravarthi. Sai Jayalakshmy Jayaram retired from professional tennis 2010.

ITF Circuit finals

Singles: 15 (7–8)

Doubles: 49 (34–15)

References

External links
 
 
 

Living people
1977 births
Racket sportspeople from Chennai
Indian female tennis players
Sportswomen from Tamil Nadu
20th-century Indian women
20th-century Indian people
Tennis players at the 1998 Asian Games
Asian Games competitors for India